Kilembe is a community in Kwilu province, Democratic Republic of the Congo (DRC).

References

 http://www.places-in-the-world.com/2314692-cd-place-kilembe.html

Populated places in Kwilu Province